TSS Amsterdam was a passenger and freight vessel built for the London and North Eastern Railway in 1930.

History

The ship was built by John Brown on Clydebank. She was launched on 30 January 1930.

On 14 October 1932, she brought Prince George, Duke of Kent back from his tour of Denmark, Sweden and the Netherlands.

War Service
In September 1939, at the outbreak of the Second World War, the ship was requisitioned by the Ministry of War Transport for troop transport. This included transporting the 51st Highland Division and Princess Louise's Kensington Regiment from Southampton to Le Havre in April 1940 as part of the British Expeditionary Force.

By 1944, she had been converted to a LSI(H) - Landing Ship Infantry (Hand-hoisting). She carried elements of the United States 2nd Ranger Battalion to Pointe du Hoc  on D-day.

By 19 July 1944, she had been converted to a Hospital Carrier ship. On 7 August 1944, she was sunk by a mine while taking casualties from Juno Beach, Calvados, France. A total of 55 patients, ten Royal Army Medical Corps staff, 30 crew and eleven prisoners of war were killed.

Seventy five wounded soldiers were carried up and delivered into lifeboats, but two of the nurses, Dorothy Field, 32, and Mollie Evershed, 27, went back below and went down with the ship.  They are the only two women whose names are on the British Normandy Memorial, with 22,000 men.

See also
Lily McNicholas

References

1930 ships
Steamships of the United Kingdom
Ships built on the River Clyde
Ships of the London and North Eastern Railway
Maritime incidents in August 1944